Dudua tetanota is a moth of the family Tortricidae. It is found in Thailand and India.

References

Moths described in 1909
Olethreutini